Bani Khalid is an Arab tribal confederation mainly inhabiting Eastern Arabia and Najd. The tribe ruled southern Iraq, Kuwait, and Eastern Arabia (al-Hasa and al-Qatif) from the 15th century to the 18th century, and again under the auspices of the Ottoman Empire during the early 19th century. At its greatest extent, the domain of Bani Khalid extended from Iraq in the north to the borders of Oman in the South, and Bani Khalid wielded political influence by ruling the region of Najd in central Arabia. Most of the tribe's members presently reside in eastern and central Saudi Arabia, while others live in Iraq, Kuwait, Qatar, Bahrain, Syria and the United Arab Emirates. Bani Khalid has both Shia Muslim and Sunni Muslim members.

Lineage 
The tribe traditionally claims descent from Khalid ibn al-Walid a senior companion of the Prophet Muhammad, and esteemed general who was crucial in the Muslim conquest of Persia and the Levant. This claim has been questioned by Arab genealogists who have suggested that the tribe may descend from his relatives from Banu Makhzum and not from Khalid himself, alternatively, they have largely been attributed to.

He mentioned in the lineage of Bani Khalid a number of sayings; Most notably:

 They are from the tribe of Banu Rabi'ah bin 'Amir bin Sa'sa'a from the Hawazin tribe

 They are a tribe from Banu Ghazia from the Tayy tribe

 They are a tribe from the offspring of Khalid ibn al-Walid, from Banu Makhzum, from the Quraysh tribe

A number of lineages from the Quraish tribe mentioned the discontinuation of Khalid bin Al-Walid's offspring and the extinction of his son, and that his relative Ayoub bin Salama bin Abdullah bin Al-Walid bin Al-Walid bin Al-Mughirah Al-Makhzumi Al -Qurashi inherited the money of Khaled bin Al-Walid bin Al-Mughira, after the death of his last descendant.

The oldest historical text in which the tribe of Bani Khalid was mentioned is what was reported by Ibn al-Atheer in his book "Al-Kamil fi al-Tarikh", speaking about the events of the year 513 AH, saying: (a group of people known as Bani Khalid); It was mentioned that their homes are near Lake Tiberias in Palestine, but the Bani Khalid that Ibn al-Athir mentioned here is not necessarily the current tribe of Bani Khalid.

History

Jabrid Emirate 

The Jabrids were the ruling class of the Bani Khaild tribe in Nejd.The Jabrids established the Arab dynasty that ruled Eastern Arabia and Nejd from the 15th to the 16th century.

Banu jabr followed the Maliki Sunni school, and made Al-Ahsa, the capital for their Emirate and the stronghold for the Bani Khaild tribe. 

The descendants of Banu Jabr can still be found in Al-Qassim, Saudi Arabia, mainly in the members of Al-Mohaimeed family, and the descendants of the Shiekh Sultan Bin Saud Al-Jabri in The Sultanate of Oman.

First Khalidi Emirate

The main branches of the tribe are the Al Humaid, the Juboor, the Du'um, the Al Janah, the Al suhoob, the Grusha, the Al Musallam, the 'Amayer, the Al Subaih and the Mahashir & Nahood. The chieftainship of the Bani Khalid has traditionally been held by the clan of Al Humaid. The Bani Khalid dominated the deserts surrounding the Al-Hasa and Al-Qatif during the 15th and 18th century. Under Barrak ibn Ghurayr of the Al Humaid, the Bani Khalid were able to expel Ottoman forces from the cities and towns in 1670 and proclaim their rule over the region. Ibn Ghurayr made his capital in Al-Mubarraz, where remnants of his castle stand today. According to Arabian folklore, one chief of the Bani Khalid attempted to protect the prized desert bustard (Habari) from extinction by prohibiting the bedouin in his realm from poaching the bird's eggs, earning the tribe the appellation of "protectors of the eggs of the Habari", an allusion to the chief's absolute supremacy over his realm. The first chieftain of the "Khawalid" was Haddori.

Fall to the Saudis
The Bani Khalid of eastern Arabia maintained ties with members of their tribe who had settled in Nejd during their earlier migration eastwards, and also cultivated clients among the rulers of the Najdi towns, such as the Al Mu'ammar of al-Uyayna. When the emir of Uyayna adopted the ideas of Muhammad ibn Abd al-Wahhab, the Khalidi chief ordered him to cease support for Ibn Abd al-Wahhab and expel him from his town. The emir agreed, and Ibn Abd al-Wahhab moved to neighboring Dir'iyyah, where he joined forces with the Al Saud. The Bani Khalid remained staunch enemies of the Saudis and their allies and attempted to invade Nejd and Diriyyah in an effort to stop Saudi expansion. Their efforts failed, however, and after conquering Nejd, the Saudis invaded the Bani Khalid's domain in al-Hasa and deposed the Al 'Ura'yir in 1793. In the early 1950s, many Al Arabi people originating from Iraq migrated to Saudi Arabia Al Qassim.

Khalidis of Jerusalem 

he Khalidis of Jerusalem rose to prominence during Mamluk rule. They became one of the most powerful families in Palestine, rivaled by the equally powerful Husayni clan as well as the Nashashibis. The Khalidi family held the banner of the Qaysi faction in Jerusalem while the Husaynis held the banner of the Yamanis. After the fall of Egypt and the Levant to the Ottomans, the Khalidis grew in power, with many of them holding key offices.

After the Tanzimat reforms were completed in the Ottoman Empire, it adopted a new government type, modeled on that of the average European nation. In accordance with the Ottoman Constitution of 1876, which had turned the Ottoman Empire into a constitutional monarchy, the Ottoman Empire now had a parliament with representatives from every Province. Yusuf Dia-Uddin Pasha Al Khalidi was the representative of Jerusalem in the Parliament, he was also the mayor of Jerusalem from 1870 to 1876 and 1878 to 1879. Yusuf Dia Pasha, had studied in Malta and learned English and French. He received a letter from Zadok Kahn Chief Rabbi of France, calling him to the Zionist cause. He replied with a letter, "In the Name of God, Leave Palestine Alone". Zadok Kahn showed the letter to Theodor Herzl the founder of political Zionism, Herzl replied "If we are not wanted in Palestine, we will search and we will find elsewhere what we seek".
Ruhi al-Khalidi
Yusuf Dia Pasha's nephew, Ruhi al Khalidi was the mayor of Jerusalem from 1899 to 1907 and the deputy of the head of parliament in 1911, he wrote extensively on early Zionism and the threats they posed, he was known to be very cross with the ruling political party the Ittihad ve Terraki for their lack of seriousness with dealing with the Zionist threat. His rising political career ended with his death to typhoid in 1913. Both Yusuf and Ruhi were part of the Ittihad be Terraki, a right wing party believing in Ottoman Islamist Nationalism, as opposed to their Husseini rivals who were Arab Nationalists.

After the Collapse of the Ottomans in WW1 due to the Great Arab Revolt, a British Mandate was set up in Palestine, charged with modernizing Palestine and granting it Independence when it was "ready". This time period was marked by Arab Nationalists strengthening their regime under the Grand Mufti of Jerusalem Amin al-Husseini. Due to the Khaldis opposition to Nationalism, they had difficult times getting back into politics. With the exceptions of Hussein al-Khalidi who was mayor from 1934 to 1937, and Mustafa al-Khalidi who was the last Arab Mayor of Jerusalem from 1938 to 1944. Mustafa was like his relatives accused of Zionism, he replied by saying,"We must recognise the facts; the Zionists have migrated to this country, become citizens, have become Palestinians, and they cannot be thrown into the sea. Likewise, some of them have bought land and received deeds in exchange for money and we must recognize them. There is no point in closing our eyes about such things". After the creation of the State of Israel, most Arab countries had turned into monarchies, meaning ascension into the political system was no easy task. Hussein al-Khalidi had managed to be appointed Prime Minister of Jordan, his cabinet was rejected multiple times however, and was forced to give up the position. His memoirs "An era of courtesies went on" were published by the Khalidi Library in Jerusalem. Descendants of the Jerusalemite branch have become highly influential academics. Walid Khalidi is a professor of history at Oxford University. The nephew of Hussein al-Khalidi, Rashid Khalidi, is a professor at Columbia University and has written extensively on the Palestinian Exodus.

The Khalidis of Jerusalem established the famous Khalidi Library near the Aqsa Mosque, which is open till this day.

Return and fall from power
When the Ottomans invaded Arabia and overthrew the Al Saud in 1818, they conquered al-Hasa, al-Qatif and reinstated members of the Al 'Uray'ir as rulers of the region. The Bani Khalid were no longer the potent military force they once were at this time, and tribes such as the Ajman, the Dawasir, Subay' and Mutayr began encroaching on the Bani Khalid's desert territories. They were also beset by internal quarrels over leadership. Though the Bani Khalid were able to forge an alliance with the 'Anizzah tribe in this period, they were eventually defeated by an alliance of several tribes along with the Al Saud, who had reestablished their rule in Riyadh in 1823. A battle with an alliance led by the Mutayr and 'Ajman tribes in 1823, and another battle with the Subay' and the Al Saud in 1830, brought the rule of the Bani Khalid to a close. The Ottomans appointed a governor from Bani Khalid over al-Hasa once more in 1874, but his rule was also short-lived.

Present
Many clans and sections of the Bani Khalid had already settled in al-Hasa and Nejd by this time, but many of those who remained leaving east Arabia after their military defeats against Ibn Saud, eventually settled in Iraq, Jordan. The clan today consists of important rulers, and members of government. Many families from Bani Khalid can be found today in Kuwait, Bahrain, Jordan Saudi Arabia and Qatar

Notable people
Among the tribe's members are: 
 Shaykh Ahmad, Shia Muslim theologian and jurist
 Wadha bint Muhammad Al Orair, mother of Prince Turki and King Saud 
 Ahmed Juffali, Saudi businessman
 Salman al-Ouda, Saudi Muslim scholar
 Ibrahim bin Abdullah Al Suwaiyel, Saudi Minister of Foreign Affairs and Minister of Environment, Water and Agriculture

Notes

References
Anscombe, Frederick F., The Ottoman Gulf: the creation of Kuwait, Saudi Arabia, and Qater, 1870–1914, Columbia University Press, New York 1997
Fattah, Hala Mundhir, The Politics of Regional Trade in Iraq, Arabia, and the Gulf, 1745–1900, SUNY Press, 1997 
Ibn Agil al-Zahiri, Ansab al-Usar al-Hakima fi al-Ahsa ("The Genealogies of the Ruling Families of al-Ahsa, Part II: Banu Humayd (Al 'Uray'ir)"), Dar al-Yamama, Riyadh, Saudi Arabia (Arabic)
أبو عبدالرحمن بن عقيل الظاهري، "أنساب الأسر الحاكمة في الأحساء، القسم الثاني: بنو حميد (آل عريعر)"، من منشورات دار اليمامة، الرياض، المملكة العربية السعودية
Ingham, B. "Muṭayr." Encyclopaedia of Islam. Edited by: P. Bearman, Th. Bianquis, C.E. Bosworth, E. van Donzel and W.P. Heinrichs. Brill, 2007. Brill Online. 1 December 2007 
Al-Jassir, Hamad, Jamharat Ansab al-Usar al-Mutahaddirah fi Nejd ("Compendium of the Geanologies of the Settled Families of Nejd"), entry on "Banu Khalid" (Arabic)
al-Juhany, Uwaidah, Najd Before the Salafi Reform Movement, Ithaca Press, 2002
Lorimer, John Gordon, Gazetteer of the Persian Gulf, Oman and Central Arabia, republished by Gregg International Publishers Limited Westemead.  Farnborough, Hants., England and Irish University Press, Shannon, Irelend.  Printed in Holland, 1970
Mandaville, Jon E., "The Ottoman Province of al-Hasā in the Sixteenth and Seventeenth Centuries", Journal of the American Oriental Society, Vol. 90, No. 3. (Jul. - Sep., 1970), pp. 486–513 
Meglio, R. Di. "banū Ḵh̲ālid ." Encyclopaedia of Islam. Edited by: P. Bearman, Th. Bianquis, C.E. Bosworth, E. van Donzel and W.P. Heinrichs. Brill, 2007. Brill Online. 1 December 2007 
Oppenheim, Max Freiherr von, with Braunlich, Erich and Caskill, Werner, Die Beduinen, 4 volumes, Otto Harrassowitz Wiesbaden 1952 (German)
Szombathy, Zoltan, Genealogy in Medieval Muslim Societies, Studia Islamica, No. 95. (2002), pp. 5–35 
Al-Rasheed, Madawi, A History of Saudi Arabia, Cambridge University Press, 2002 (through GoogleBooks )
Rentz, George, "Notes on Oppenheim's 'Die Beduinen'", Oriens, Vol. 10, No. 1. (31 Jul. 1957), pp. 77–89 
Al-Wuhaby, Abd al-Karim al-Munif, Banu Khalid wa 'Alaqatuhum bi Najd ("Banu Khalid and their Relations with Nejd"), Dar Thaqif lil-Nashr wa-al-Ta'lif, 1989 (Arabic)
عبدالكريم الوهيبي، "بنو خالد وعلاقتهم بنجد"، دار ثقيف للنشر والتأليف، 1989

Arabs from the Ottoman Empire
Tribes of Arabia
Tribes of Iraq
Ottoman Arabia
Tribes of Kuwait
Tribes of Saudi Arabia